Bicrisia is a genus of bryozoans belonging to the family Crisiidae.

The genus has almost cosmopolitan distribution.

Species:

Bicrisia abyssicola 
Bicrisia biciliata 
Bicrisia edwardsiana 
Bicrisia erecta 
Bicrisia gibraltarensis 
Bicrisia robertsonae

References

Bryozoan genera
Cyclostomatida